Genevieve Lemon (born 21 April 1958) is an Australian actress and singer who has appeared in a number of Australian television series and international film, including a frequent collaboration with Jane Campion for Academy Award-winning The Piano (1993) and The Power of the Dog (2021), which earned her a Satellite Award as cast member and a Critic's Choice Awards nomination. In television Lemon is best known as Zelda Baker in The Young Doctors, Marlene "Rabbit" Warren in Prisoner and Brenda Riley in Neighbours.

Lemon has also appeared in numerous musical and stage productions, performing in major Australian theaters, with the direction of Stephan Elliott, Allan Scott, Nick Enright, Rodney Fisher, Robyn Nevin, Aubrey Mellor and Jonathan Biggins. She was cast for the original Australian stage of Billy Elliot the Musical by Elton John and Lee Hall, winning the Helpmann Award for Best Leading Actress in 2008.

Career

1982-1992: Beginnings in theatre and television and the acclaim with Sweetie 
Lemon began her acting with the Leichhardt-based amateur theatre company, The Rocks Players in inner city Sydney, until graduating from the University of New South Wales in 1982. After working with Rodney Fisher's musical Steaming, Her professional career began on TV in 1982 with a minor role in Sons and Daughters, followed shortly after with a larger role as Nurse Zelda Baker in the eighth season of The Young Doctors. Between 1984 and 1985 Lemon starred as Marlene Warren in the television series Prisoner, receiving critical acclaim, winning a Penguin Award for her role.

Between 1985 and 1988 Lemon performed in numerous Australian musicals, working for the Sydney Theatre Company, Hunter Valley Theatre Company and Northside Theatre Company, under the artistic direction of Noel Ferrier, Jon Ewing, Jean-Pierre Mignon and Rodney Fisher. In 1989 Lemon played Debbo in Judy Morris's film Luigi's Ladies and was also cast as the lead actress in Jane Campion's film Sweetie. The latter role earned her a nomination at the AACTA Awards for Best Actress in a Leading Role, and she won in the same category at the AFCA Awards.

After guest appearances on the television series The Flying Doctors and G.P., Lemon was cast as Brenda Riley in the television series Neighbours between 1991 and 1992. In the same years she appeared in several theatre productions, including Summer Rain by Rodney Fisher, critical acclaimed The Venetian Twins by John Bell, and The Girl Who Save Everything by Robyn Nevin.

1993-2005: The Piano and the Sydney Theatre Company 
In 1993, Lemon again acted under the direction of Jane Campion in the Academy Award-winning film The Piano, co-starring with Holly Hunter and Harvey Keitel. Later she also acted in Australian television film Big Ideas and ABC mini-series Seven Deadly Sins. After stage acting in Aubrey Mellor's Brilliant Lies and Rodney Fisher's And a Nightingale Sang, Lemon returned to film in the movie Billy's Holiday in 1995. In 1996 she performed in Miracle City by Nick Enright and Max Lambert, and Merrily We Roll Along by Wayne Harrison.

In 1997 Lemon was cast for Samantha Lang's film The Well acting with Pamela Rabe, Miranda Otto, Paul Chubb, and Frank Wilson. Over the next two years, she appeared in numerous theatre productions, including Taming of the Shrew by Glen Elston, Daylight Saving by Nick Enright, and in The Milemonum Project written and devised by Lemon and Russell Dykstra. In 1999 Jane Campion cast Lemon for two films: Holy Smoke! and Soft Fruit.

From 1999 to 2005 Lemon became an integral part of the casts of Sydney Theatre Company productions, appearing in the musical Piaf by Adam Coo, Morning Sacrifice by Jennifer Flowers, The Republic of Myopia by Jonathan Biggins, Summer Rain by Robyn Nevin, and My Brilliant Divorce by Gary Down. In 2003 Lemon acted in television films The Postcard Bandit and Mermaids.

2006-2011: Success with Priscilla, Queen of the Desert and Billy Elliot the Musical 
In 2006, after starring in Paul Goldman's film Suburban Mayhem, Lemon was played as Shirley in Stephan Elliott and Allan Scott's critical acclaimed musical Priscilla, Queen of the Desert, touring between 2006 and 2008 the major theatres of Australia and New Zealand. In 2008 Lemon gave voice to Charlotte's Mum, Henry's Mum and Madame in the animated film The Adventures of Charlotte and Henry.

In 2007 Lemon was selected for Australian production of Billy Elliot the Musical, written by Lee Hall, directed by Stephen Daldry with music by Sir. Elton John. She played Mrs Wilkinson from 2007 to 2009, received positive reviews by critics and winning the Sydney Theatre Awards, the Green Room Awards, and the Helpmann Award for her performance. From 2010 and 2011 Lemon was cast for the fifth anniversary United Kingdom tour of the musical's debut.

2012-2018: Top of the Lake, The Dressmaker and new stage production projects 
In 2012 Lemon plays in Death of a Salesman musical by Trevor Ashley, and The Mousetrap by Gary Young. In 2013 Lemon came back to television acting as Bunny in Jane Campion's mini-series Top of the Lake, winning the Equity Ensemble as a cast member. The same year she act in The Pirates of Penzance  by Dean Bryant at the Hamer Hall in Melbourne.

In 2014 Lemon played Dotty Otley in Jonathan Biggins's Noises Off production at the Sydney Opera House, She was also cast for season three of television series Rake, and Australian mini-series The Secret River. In 2015 she was cast with Kate Winslet, Judy Davis and Liam Hemsworth in critical acclaimed The Dressmaker directed by Jocelyn Moorhouse. The next two years Lemon worked with Belvoir St Theatre Company and Sydney Theatre Company.

In 2017 she played in The Homosexuals, or “Faggots” by Lee Lewis, Who's Afraid of Virginia Woolf? by Iain Sinclair, and Melba by Wayne Harrison and Michael Tyack. The next year Lemon played as Mrs. Wentworth in Bruce Beresford's film Ladies in Black, and had a recurring role in television series Home and Away.

2019-present: Critical acclaim, The Power of the Dog and television 
In 2019 Lemon starred in Thomas M. Wright's film Acute Misfortune. The same year she played Sister Winnie in Terence O'Donnell's musical Folk.

In 2020 was announced the participation of Lemon, Benedict Cumberbatch, Kirsten Dunst and Jesse Plemons in Jane Campion's project The Power of the Dog. The cast performance was critically acclaimed, receiving positive reviews and numerous nominations in several film awards, including Academy Award, Golden Globe and BEFFTA Awards Lemon won her first Satellite Award and received a Critics' Choice Awards nomination as a member of the cast.

In 2021 Lemon starred in the recurring role of Fiona Palmer in the Australian television series Eden and as in the critical acclaim series The Tourist. In November 2021 the film Here Out West was presented at the Sydney Film Festival, in which Lemon starred as Nancy. From March to April 2022, Lemon starred as Mrs Thornhill in the theatrical adaptation of North by Northwest at the Sydney Lyric Theatre.

Filmography

Film

Television

Television film

Radio

Theatre and musical

Sydney Theatre Company productions 
Sydney Theatre Company is an Australian theatre company based in Sydney, New South Wales, which performs at The Wharf Theatre, the Roslyn Packer Theatre and the Sydney Opera House. Lemon has performed in nineteen productions with the company.

International productions and tours

Other Australian productions

Awards and nominations

Film and television awards

Theatre awards

References

External links
 
  More Genevieve Lemon info at GENLEMON.COM
 Extensive interview about her television work on the Boxcutters podcast
Genevieve Lemon Curriculum Vitae at Shanahan Management

20th-century Australian actresses
21st-century Australian actresses
Australian film actresses
Australian musical theatre actresses
Australian soap opera actresses
Helpmann Award winners
Living people
1958 births